The 2004–05 Bundesliga was the 42nd season of the Bundesliga, Germany's premier football league. It began on 6 August 2004 and concluded on 21 May 2005.

Teams
Eighteen teams competed in the league – the top fifteen teams from the previous season and the three teams promoted from the 2. Bundesliga. The promoted teams were 1. FC Nürnberg, Arminia Bielefeld and 1. FSV Mainz 05. 1. FC Nürnberg and Arminia Bielefeld returned to the top flight after an absence of one year while 1. FSV Mainz 05 played in the top flight for the first time in history. They replaced Eintracht Frankfurt and 1. FC Köln (both teams relegated after a season's presence) and 1860 Munich (ending their top flight spell of ten years).

Team overview

(*) Promoted from 2. Bundesliga.

League table

Results

Overall
Most wins – Bayern Munich (24)
Fewest wins – SC Freiburg (3)
Most draws – Hertha BSC (13)
Fewest draws – Schalke 04, Hamburger SV and VfL Wolfsburg (3)
Most losses – SC Freiburg (22)
Fewest losses – Bayern Munich (5)
Most goals scored – Bayern Munich (75)
Fewest goals scored – SC Freiburg (30)
Most goals conceded – SC Freiburg (75)
Fewest goals conceded – Bayern Munich (33)

Top scorers

Champion squad

References

External links

2004–05 Bundesliga on kicker.de

Bundesliga seasons
1
Germany